Joachim Busse (born 10 March 1954) is a retired West German long jumper.

He finished sixth at the 1975 European Indoor Championships, won the bronze medal at the 1976 European Indoor Championships, finished fifth at the 1980 European Indoor Championships and also at the 1981 European Indoor Championships .

He became West German champion in 1975, 1981 and 1984, representing the sports clubs Bayer 05 Uerdingen, LG Bayer Leverkusen and ASV Köln.

His personal best jump was 8.12 metres, achieved in July 1981 in Gelsenkirchen.

References

1954 births
Living people
West German male long jumpers
Bayer 05 Uerdingen athletes
LG Bayer Leverkusen athletes
ASV Köln athletes